Percale is a closely woven plain-weave fabric often used for bed covers. Percale has a thread count of about 200 or higher and is noticeably tighter than the standard type of weave used for bedsheets. It has medium weight, is firm and smooth with no gloss, and warps and washes very well. It is made from both carded and combed yarns, and may be woven of various fibers, such as cotton, polyester, or various blends.

History 
Moris or mauris was the 18th century French term used for percale, the cloth imported from India. It was  a cotton cloth. Moris was the third most exported fabric from Coromandel Coast after Longcloth and Salampore. It was superior and finer quality than the peers. Coromandel coastline forms a part of Tamil Nadu and Andhra Pradesh. Moris was produced at Nellore, Arni, Maduranthakam, and Cuddalore. Palakollu.The cloth was famous as painted chintz in southeast countries also. 

Percale was formerly imported from India in the 17th and 18th centuries, then manufactured in France.

Etymology
The word may originate from the Persian pargālah, meaning rag, although the Oxford English Dictionary (as of December 2005) has traced it only as far as 18th-century French. The etymological dictionary of Catalan explains  as derived from Perche in France. 

In the year 1322 in Dalmatia, which had trade connections also as the Republic of Venice, Peter de genere Percal was mentioned. This word Percal, which occurred the first time in a Supreme Court verdict on Latin in 1322 in Dalmatia, derived from the Hebrew word פרקליט, which derived from the Ancient Greek word παράκλητος, which means lawyer. The relationship between bedding and law in ancient Persia can be guessed, because according to Phanias of Eresus, Artaxerxes I of Persia had given to Themistocles the city of Percote with bedding for his house. 

Taking into account the different spellings of this "generatio Percal" due to the variations Parkly and Perkly in Dalmatia, the name of a farm near Linlithgow Palace in Scotland, which had been built in the 14th century by a first cousin of the grandmother of this Peter de genere Percal, was mentioned in 1431 also as Parkly. This farm was also mentioned as Parkle (1431), Perkley (1432), Parcle (1438), Perkle (1439), Parklye (1440), Parklee (1489), Perklee (1490/91), Parklie (1528), Pairklie (1638), Pairkly (1647) and Parkly (1648) since then and it is mentioned as Parkley since 1671.

See also
 Sateen
 Silk

References

External links 
 

Woven fabrics